Ricco may refer to:

 Ricco (crater), a lunar impact crater
 Ricco (given name), a given name
 Ricco (painter), a Swiss painter
 Ricco (surname), a surname
 Ricco's law, discovered by astronomer Annibale Riccò
 Monte Ricco, a mountain of the Veneto region of Italy
 Mr. Ricco, a 1975 crime drama film directed by Paul Bogart